The Western New England Institute for Psychoanalysis is a New Haven, Connecticut based institute which specializes in the training of the psychoanalysis of children, adolescents, and adults. 
It also overlooks the Western New England Psychoanalytic Society, which sponsors the New Haven Psychoanalytic Research Training Program and The Muriel Gardiner Program. The Western New England Institute for Psychoanalysis was established  provisionally in 1952 and fully recognized in 1956 by the American Psychoanalytic Association. Jonathan Lear, Sidney H. Phillips, Donald J. Cohen, Steven R. Marans and Linda C. Mayes and have all worked as psychoanalysts at the institute.

References

External links
Official site

1952 establishments in Connecticut
Mental health organizations in Connecticut
Education in Connecticut
Buildings and structures in New Haven, Connecticut
Organizations established in 1952
Psychoanalysis in the United States